is a Hankyu railway station in Itami, Hyōgo Prefecture, Japan. The station number is HK-18. Prior to opening, the station was temporarily called Itamiguchi .

History 

 1921 (Taishō 10) 
 May 10 - Hanshin Express Railway (Later Hanlyu Electric Railway) opened between Tsukaguchi Station and Itami Station on the Itami Line.
 1995 (Heisei 7)
 January 17 - Itami Station was damaged by the Great Hanshin-Awaji Earthquake, and all lines were suspended.
 January 21 - Service of stations between Tsukaguchi and Itami stations were restored.
 2013 (Heisei 25)
 December 21 - Station numbering was introduced.

Station Strcuture 
Inano station is an above-ground station with two opposite platforms on both sides. It is classified as a stop due to the lack of railroad switch or railway signals.

Station building and ticket gates are located at the south end of the station (near Tsukaguchi) for each platform. Since there is no overpass connecting each platform inside the ticket gate, it is required to go through the railroad crossing outside of the ticket gates, which are adjacent to the station building.

Although internal railroad crossings were installed previously, crossings for passengers were removed due to Hankyu Corporation's policy. Therefore, if you enter the station by mistake, you will have to tell the station staff for you to exit. However, since there is no station staff at the ticket gate of the Tsukaguchi-bound platform, you will need to use the intercom near the ticket gate to summon a station staff.

Restrooms are located near the ticket gate on the Itami-bound platform, and the Tsukaguchi-bound platform has a waiting room and vending machine for soft drinks.

In 2007, construction near the ticket gates was carried out on both platforms, and the slopes were renovated along with toilets. There was a temporary entrance for passengers at the ticket gate for Itami, but it was left unused for years. The current restroom was relocated to the place where this entrance had been.

Adjacent stations

References

Railway stations in Hyōgo Prefecture
Railway stations in Japan opened in 1921